Gold is an 2022 Indian Malayalam-language comedy drama film written, directed and edited by Alphonse Puthren. It was jointly produced by Supriya Menon of Prithviraj Productions and Listin Stephen of Magic Frames. The film stars Prithviraj Sukumaran and Nayanthara, along with a supporting cast of Mallika Sukumaran, Shammi Thilakan, Lalu Alex, Baburaj, Ajmal Ameer, Shanthi Krishna, Jagadish, Krishna Sankar, Roshan Mathew, Vinay Forrt, and Saiju Kurup. 

In addition to writing, editing and directing the film, Puthren also worked on the stunt choreography, visual effects, color grading, and animation titles of the film. It marks his return to direction after seven years since Premam (2015). Principal photography commenced in September 2021 and ended in June 2022. 

Initially set for worldwide theatrical release during Onam, in September 2022, it was deferred due to delays in the post-production and eventually opened in theatres on 1 December 2022, where it received mixed reviews from critics and became a box-office bomb.

Plot 
"Danger" Joshi. S Kunjan, who owns a mobile shop, purchases a new car owing to a marriage alliance, that is almost fixed with Radha. However on the delivery day, Joshi and his mother find that someone has parked a pickup truck with a load of portable speakers. Joshi complains to the police, but they're busy and decide to look into it slowly. The next morning, Joshi discovers that the small boxes inside the truck are not portable speakers, but gold bars painted as speakers. Joshi, who believes that he has struck gold, literally, buys a gold furnace from an acquaintance and melts one speaker. The police arrive to investigate, but decide to leave the truck due to unavailability of ground space in the police station. 

It is later revealed that the gold was supposed to be dowry for the marriage between Sumangli Unnikrishnan, daughter of Unnikrishnan, the owner of the shopping complex in which Joshi's mobile shop is situated, and Unnikrishnan's friend, "Idea" Shaji's son, Suneesh. When Unnikrishnan's associate, Usman, was driving for the delivery of the gold, it was ambushed by another gang, headed by Boss Freddy, who learnt about the gold. However, Usman managed to escape and parked the truck in the entrance of Joshi's house, since it was empty that day. 

Boss Freddy's men arrive at Joshi's house to silently take the truck away, but Joshi finds and thrashes them. Upon knowing the location of the truck, Sumangali and Unnikrishnan try to retrieve the gold themselves, along with Usman, but to no avail. Joshi's wedding alliance is also called off since Shaji unknowingly admitted to Radha's parents that the complex will be blasted with dynamite once it is transfered to Suneesh. Meanwhile, the police make space at the police station and inform Joshi that they will take the truck the next day, in the evening. Unnikrishnan cancels Sumangali's marriage as he learns that Shaji and Suneesh only wanted the dowry and transfer of the shopping complex. 

With time running out as only 20 gold bars were switched, Joshi manages to buy 180 portable speakers. He manages to only switch 170 of remaining gold bars, leaving 10 bars in the truck. Later, Sumangali takes over her father as the owner of the shopping complex, and is later impressed with Joshi when Baazi calls him to ask which mobile Sumangali should buy next. 6 months later, Joshi sends a letter to the CM Kalamassery Ajayan, revealing that he delivered  of black money to a charity fund anonymously, in order to provide houses to the poor and laptops to students. He took 10℅ of the total money as tax, and refers himself as "Gold". It is also revealed that the 10 gold bars which Joshi could not switch, are still inside the truck. Sumangali is also revealed to have an interest in Joshi, but is confused whether to choose between Joshi or Gold.

Cast

Production
Production began with a pooja ceremony on 8 September 2021. Originally planned to shoot within Kerala, location was shifted outside of Kerala due to COVID-19 pandemic restrictions in the state. Produced by Supriya Menon of Prithviraj Productions and Listin Stephen of Magic Frames. Puthren was directing a film after a gap of six years since Premam. With a song sequence choreographed by Puthren's wife Aleena Antony at Fort Kochi, the filming was wrapped up on 14 June 2022. Cinematography was done by Anend C. Chandran and Viswajith Odukkathil. Apart from directing, Puthren also handled editing, stunt choreography, visual effects, and color grading of the film.

Soundtrack 
The music of the film was composed by Puthren's regular composer Rajesh Murugesan. The soundtrack is distributed by Magic Frames Music. The song "Hands Up Zindagi" contains a reprised version of the Hindi song "Zindagi Ek Safar Hai" from Andaz (1971).

Release
Initially, the film was scheduled for a theatrical release on 8 September 2022 on the occasion of Onam. Subbiah Shanmughan of SSI Productions distributed the Tamil and Malayalam version of the film in Tamil Nadu. The film completed censoring on 28 November 2022, with a runtime of 2 hours 45 minutes. With that, the release date was announced to be on 1 December 2022. Due to dubbing and censoring delays, the Tamil dubbed version was released only a days later on 2 December 2022. The digital rights of the film were bagged by Amazon Prime Video and satellite rights were sold to Sun TV Network.

Reception 
Princy Alexander of Onmanorama appreciated the movie for portraying its brilliance on a man's inner psyche for luxuries in life. If 'Premam' was a love story and 'Neram' focused on a man's tryst with time, 'Gold' definitely does justice to the film's theme. Manoj Kumar. R of The Indian Express gave 3 out of 5 stars and wrote "How do you enjoy an Alphonse Puthren film? By simply being in the moment. If you expect the narrative to take you someplace else, you might be left disappointed. Instead, if you choose to enjoy what the film is offering you at any given moment, you will find entertainment. Like life, in Alphonse’s films, it’s not the destination but the journey that matters."

OTTplay gave 3 out of 5 stars and wrote "The highlight of Prithviraj Sukumaran’s Gold, right from its outset, is its making; Alphonse has carefully conceived and crafted each of the scenes of the film that blends with Rajesh Murugesan’s thumping music." Janani. K of India Today gave 2 out of 5 stars and criticized Alphonse's script as "wafer-thin" and "incohesive", but praised Prithviraj's performance by describing him as the "soul" of the film. In a 2/5 review for Firstpost, Anna M. M. Vetticad wrote, “Despite its flaws, Gold’s first half is entertaining. The post-interval downhill slide is so rapid (...) No amount of catchy music, production polish and star wattage can camouflage skin-and-bones writing. Gold plating, after all, is just that – plating.”

References

External links
 
 

Indian comedy-drama films
2020s Malayalam-language films